Amblyeleotris guttata, the spotted prawn-goby is a species of goby native to reefs of the Western Pacific Ocean, that includes the Philippines to Tonga, north to the Ryukyu Islands, south to Australia.

This species can reach a length of  SL.  It can also be found in the aquarium trade.

References

External links
 

guttata
Fish of Palau
Fish described in 1938